The Ugandan Big League is the second tier of Ugandan football pyramid.

History

Original concept 
The concept of re-structuring Ugandan football with the creation of a new second tier league was first mooted in October 2008 by the Federation of Uganda Football Associations.  The idea that was single-handedly promoted by Eng. Moses Magogo was ridiculed, resisted, and fought by everyone. Although Magogo felt abandoned but he was buoyed by the inaugural clubs that were determined to proceed. Eventually out of persistence, Magogo won one by one convert and eventually the league was passed by the FUFA Executive Committee. The new national second division league, known as the FUFA Big League (FBL),  was to cater for leading sides in the five regions. Second tier sides at that time competed at the regional level, with many of them failing to cope with advancement whenever they gained promotion to the national Super League.

FUFA Competitions Committee secretary, Moses Magogo, confirmed that qualification to the Super League through the regional mini leagues would be ended and replaced by promotion through the national first division league. A major objective of the initiative was to help raise the standard of football outside the Super League.

Administration 

The FUFA Big League (FBL) is managed by the FUFA Competitions Committee and was launched on 6 August 6, 2009.  The following clubs are eligible to play in the FBL:
 Clubs that participated in the Uganda Premier League (UPL) in the previous season and were relegated;
 Clubs that participated in the FBL in the previous season and were not relegated to the regional leagues;
 Clubs that participated in the FBL in the previous season and were not promoted to the UPL; and
 Clubs that are promoted from the FUFA Regional Competitions through an FBL Qualification Competition.

If there are more than 16 clubs in the FBL it is divided into two groups with each group being run as a league competition. However, if there are less than 17 clubs, the competition will be run as a single group league competition.

The Competitions Committee set stringent standards for member clubs covering computer literacy, a sound bank account, stadia that meet FUFA standards, qualified coaches and doctors.   The initial requirements for clubs included:

 Payment of a sh250,000 registration fee;
 An office or physical address with a fixed telephone line, fax and e-mail address;
 A secretary with a minimum O-level qualification;
 Signing of legal declaration form covering discipline; and
 Submission of bank statements to the FUFA Competitions Committee.

Initial participants 
The 16 clubs that competed in the first season of the FBL in 2009-10 were as follows:

Honours

Big League Championship Playoffs

Big League Promotion Playoffs

Big League Group honours

Elgon Group

Rwenzori Group

Player Honours

Sponsorship 
On 1 November 2013,  it was announced that the Airtel Telecommunications company
had signed a four-year contract providing a total of 400 million shillings (about 160,000 US dollars) towards funding different activities under both the FUFA Big League and the Ugandan Cup until 2016.

References

External links 
 Uganda - List of Champions - RSSSF (Hans Schöggl)
 Ugandan Football League Tables - League321.com

 
2
Sports leagues established in 2009
2009 establishments in Uganda
Second level football leagues in Africa